Santo Domingo is the capital of the Dominican Republic.

Santo Domingo may also refer to:

Places 
Santo Domingo, a historic name for the island of Hispaniola
 Captaincy General of Santo Domingo, the former Spanish colony on the island
 Santo Domingo, the common English name for the Dominican Republic until the 20th century

Areas of the Dominican Republic
 Santo Domingo Province, a province, split in 2001 from the National District, that includes the hinterland of the capital city of the same name
 Greater Santo Domingo, the metropolitan area of Santo Domingo and its surroundings
 Roman Catholic Archdiocese of Santo Domingo, Latin Metropolitan Archdiocese in the Dominican Republic

Municipalities

Argentina
 Santo Domingo, La Rioja

Chile
 Santo Domingo, Chile, a city and commune

Colombia
 Santo Domingo, Antioquia
 Silos, Norte de Santander, a municipality of Norte de Santander Department, also known as Santo Domingo de Silos

Costa Rica
 Santo Domingo, Costa Rica

Cuba
 Santo Domingo, Cuba, a municipality in Villas Clara, Cuba

Ecuador
 Santo Domingo de Los Tsáchilas Province, Ecuador, a province in Ecuador, incorporating:
 Santo Domingo Canton (Ecuador), the only canton in that province
 Santo Domingo de Los Colorados, the Capital of the province
Roman Catholic Diocese of Santo Domingo de los Colorados, the diocese with its seat in that city

El Salvador
 Santo Domingo, San Vicente, a municipality
 Santo Domingo, Sonsonate

Guatemala
 Santo Domingo de Cobán, another name for Cobán
 Santo Domingo Xenacoj, a municipality

Mexico
 Santo Domingo, Oaxaca (disambiguation), several places
 Santo Domingo, San Luis Potosí, a municipality

Nicaragua
 Santo Domingo, Chontales

Panama
 Santo Domingo, Chiriquí
 Santo Domingo, Los Santos

Paraguay 
 Santo Domingo (Asunción)

Peru
 Santo Domingo District, district in Morropon Province, Piura region
 Santo Domingo de los Olleros District, district in Huarochiri Province, Lima region
 Santo Domingo de la Capilla District, district in Cutervo Province, Cajamarca region
 Santo Domingo de Acobamba District, district in Huancayo Province, Junin region
 Santo Domingo de Capillas District, district in Huaytara Province, Huancavelica region

Philippines
 Santo Domingo, Albay, a 4th class municipality
 Santo Domingo, Cainta
 Santo Domingo de Basco, Batanes (also known just as Basco), a municipality
 Santo Domingo, Ilocos Sur, a 3rd class municipality
 Santo Domingo, Nueva Ecija, a 3rd class municipality

Puerto Rico
Santo Domingo, Peñuelas, Puerto Rico
 Santo Domingo, Puerto Rico, a commune of Peñuelas
 Santo Domingo (Peñuelas)

Spain
 Santo Domingo de la Calzada, after Domingo de la Calzada
 Santo Domingo de Silos, after Dominic of Silos
Santo Domingo (Madrid Metro), a station on Line 2

United States
 Santo Domingo Pueblo, New Mexico, a Native American pueblo in New Mexico

Venezuela
 Santo Domingo, Mérida
 Santo Domingo, Táchira

Rivers
 Santo Domingo River, Venezuela
 Santo Domingo River (Papaloapan), Mexico
 Santo Domingo River (Chiapas), Mexico
 Santo Domingo River (Oaxaca), Mexico
 São Domingos Grande River, Brazil

Buildings

Churches and other religious buildings 
 Santo Domingo convent, in Buenos Aires, Argentina
 Church of Santo Domingo de Guzmán, a church and former monastery in Oaxaca, Mexico
 Santo Domingo (Mexico City), a church and plaza in the historic center of Mexico City
 Basilica and Convent of Santo Domingo, a Rococo-Mudéjar Colonial basilica in Lima, Peru
 Monastery of Santo Domingo de Silos, in Spain
 Church of Santo Domingo, Soria, a church in Spain
 Santo Domingo, Oviedo, a church in Spain
 Santo Domingo de Guzman, Terrinches, a 15th-century church in Spain

Other buildings 
 Fort Santo Domingo, a former Spanish fort on Taiwan in present-day Tamsui
 Estadio Santo Domingo (disambiguation)

Geology
 Santo Domingo Formation, Miocene sedimentary formation in Southern Chile
 Laguna Brava Formation, formerly known as Santo Domingo Formation, Eocene sedimentary formation in the Argentine Northwest

People
 Santo Domingo (1170–1221), a Spanish priest usually known in English as Saint Dominic

Santo Domingo family 
Members of the Santo Domingo family, a prominent Colombian-American family:
 Julio Mario Santo Domingo (1923–2011), billionaire and former director of the Santo Domingo Group
 Julio Mario Santo Domingo Jr., Colombian-American businessman
 Tatiana Santo Domingo, member of the royal family of Monaco
 Bettina Santo Domingo, American filmmaker
 Carolina Santo Domingo, American fashion designer
 Lauren Santo Domingo, American fashion businesswoman
 Alejandro Santo Domingo, Colombian-American businessman
 Nieves Santo Domingo, Argentine journalist
 Lady Charlotte Santo Domingo, British socialite

Other
 "Santo Domingo" (song), a 1965 pop song by Wanda Jackson

See also 
 St Dominic (disambiguation)
 San Domenico (disambiguation)
 Saint-Domingue, historical French colony on Hispaniola
 Domingo (disambiguation)
 San Domingo (disambiguation)